The Flag of Nigeria between 1914 and 1960 was a British blue ensign with a green six-pointed star described as the Seal of Solomon, surrounding a Tudor Crown (later changed to a St Edward's Crown in 1953) with the white word "Nigeria" under it on a red disc. It was adopted by the Colony and Protectorate of Nigeria following the amalgamation of the Southern Nigeria Protectorate and Northern Nigeria Protectorate.

History 
The colonial flag of Nigeria was adopted in 1914 following the amalgamation of Southern Nigeria and Northern Nigeria. The crest on the flag was also used on the flag of the Governor-General of Nigeria.

In April 1940, former colonial governor-general Frederick Lugard explained the green hexagram on the flag:

The flag was not universally accepted. In 1959, prior to Nigerian Independence a competition to design a new flag was held with Taiwo Akinkunmi designing the new flag of Nigeria which replaced blue ensign in 1960.

References

See also
Flag of Nigeria

Blue Ensigns
Colonial Nigeria
Nigeria (1914-1960)
Nigeria